The Anderson–Capner House is located at 700 Trumbull Avenue in Lawrence Township, New Jersey. Constructed in 1764, it is the last remaining pre-revolutionary building and farm house in the southern part of the township.  Thomas Capner purchased the house in 1829 and introduced new scientific methods of farming to the area.  It was listed on the National Register of Historic Places in 1973.

References

See also 
 National Register of Historic Places listings in Mercer County, New Jersey

Houses completed in 1764
Houses on the National Register of Historic Places in New Jersey
Houses in Mercer County, New Jersey
Lawrence Township, Mercer County, New Jersey
National Register of Historic Places in Mercer County, New Jersey
New Jersey Register of Historic Places
1764 establishments in New Jersey